Haljinići (Cyrillic: Хаљинићи) is a village in the municipality of Kakanj, Bosnia and Herzegovina.

History 
Before 1991 village  Haljinići also included settlement Bistrik-Crkvenjak, which since 1991 has been listed as an administrative entity in its own right.

Demographics 
According to the 2013 census, its population was 262.

References

Populated places in Kakanj